Dame Judith Anne Kilpatrick  (born ) is a retired New Zealand nursing academic. After serving as head of the nursing school at the Auckland Institute of Technology, she moved to the University of Auckland, where she co-founded the School of Nursing in 1999.

In the 1998 Queen's Birthday Honours, she was appointed a Companion of the New Zealand Order of Merit, for services to nursing education. In the 2021 Queen's Birthday Honours, she was promoted to Dame Companion of the same order, also for services to nursing education.

References

Living people
New Zealand nurses
Academic staff of the University of Auckland
Dames Companion of the New Zealand Order of Merit
Academic staff of the Auckland University of Technology
New Zealand medical researchers
Year of birth missing (living people)